Happy Anniversary and Goodbye is a 1974 American TV movie directed by Jack Donohue and starring Lucille Ball and Art Carney as Norma and Malcolm Michaels.

Plot
Norma and Malcolm Michaels are a middle-aged married couple who are in the midst of a midlife crisis. Both decide to separate and begin their lives anew away from each other. However, problems ensue once they discover that they are no longer as young as they used to be. In the end, they realize that they still love each other.

Cast
 Lucille Ball as Norma Michaels
 Art Carney as Malcolm Michaels
 Nanette Fabray as Fay
 Peter Marshall as Greg Carter
 Don Porter as Ed "Mad Dog" Murphy
 Arnold Schwarzenegger appears briefly as massage therapist Rico, the object of Norma's ogling

Reception

Critical response
The special was the fourth highest rated program for the week, and it won its time slot with a rating of 27.9 and 42% share of the viewing audience.

See also
 List of American films of 1974

References

External links

1974 films
1974 television films
1974 comedy films
American comedy films
CBS network films
Films directed by Jack Donohue
1970s English-language films
1970s American films